The European Badminton Circuit is a series of international badminton tournaments in Europe, sanctioned by Badminton World Federation (BWF). The circuit consists of BWF International Challenge, BWF International Series and BWF Future Series tournaments held in Europe. The circuit usually starts in September and ends in April.

Prize money 
BWF International Challenge tournaments offers more than $20,000 prize money, while BWF International Series tournaments offers more than $8,000 prize money. BWF Future Series tournaments offers up to $8,000 of prize money. The distribution of prize mone differs on each tournament type. BWF International Challenge tournaments rewards prize money for semifinalist for singles and only both finalist for doubles. BWF International Series tournaments offers prize money for finalist for singles and the doubles champion. BWF Future Series tournaments only distribute prize money to champions of singles and doubles.

External links 
 Official website

References 

 
Badminton tours and series
European international sports competitions
Badminton tournaments  in Europe